The XIV 2008 Pan Am Badminton Championships were held in Lima, Peru, between October 1 and October 5, 2008.

This event was part of the 2008 BWF Grand Prix Gold and Grand Prix series of the Badminton World Federation.

Venue
Club de Regatas, Lima

Medalists

References

 
 BWF Tournament Calendar 2008
http://tournamentsoftware.com/sport/drawsheet.aspx?id=C0B7B7D9-BE86-45A0-A7AE-D37AEAE959CD&draw=7
http://tournamentsoftware.com/sport/winners.aspx?id=88150F04-2B0B-4983-AEE7-F18AD7ED308C

External links
Official website
TournamentSoftware.com: Individual Results
TournamentSoftware.com: Team Results

Pan Am Badminton Championships
Pan Am Badminton Championships
Pan Am Badminton Championships
Sports competitions in Lima
Badminton tournaments in Peru